Look Your Best or The Bitterness of Sweets is a 1923 American comedy silent black and white film directed and written by Rupert Hughes. It stars Antonio Moreno and Colleen Moore.

Plot
As described in a film magazine, young Italian woman Perla Quaranta (Moore) dances in the streets to the music from her father's barrel organ. Her grace attracts the attention of Carlo Bruni (Moreno), manager of a small theatrical troupe. He hires her to replace an actress who has grown overweight due to her overindulgence with food. Perla makes good with this chance, though she too gives into the temptation of pies, cakes, and other pastries. Carlo is also given into overeating, with his figure suffering and his dancing powers impaired. Perla begins to take on weight, just like her predecessor. She repulses an attempt by a stage hand, Krug (Metcalfe), to court her. In revenge, he tampers with the wire used by Perla when performing her butterfly act. Carlo suspects Krug and thrashes him. Carlo then receives a sentence of thirty days in jail for this assault. Meanwhile, Perla, in her convalescence, is almost won by a baker who describes the tempting pastries he makes. When Carlo returns after serving his sentence, he and Perla resolve to diet steadily and win fame as dancers. They do so and are married into the bargain.

Cast
 Colleen Moore as Perla Quaranta
 Antonio Moreno as Carlo Bruni
 William Orlamond as Pietro
 Orpha Alba as Nella
 Earl Metcalfe as Krug
 Martha Mattox as Mrs. Blitz
 Francis McDonald as Alberto Cabotto

Preservation
No copies of Look Your Best are listed in any film archives, making this a lost film.

References

External links

Films directed by Rupert Hughes
Films with screenplays by Rupert Hughes
Silent American comedy films
1923 comedy films
1923 films
1920s English-language films
American black-and-white films
Goldwyn Pictures films
1920s American films